Albert Russel Erskine (January 24, 1871 – July 1, 1933) was an American businessman.  Born in Huntsville, Alabama, he worked in a number of manufacturing industries before joining the Studebaker motor car manufacturing firm in 1911. He served as Studebaker's president from 1915 until the firm encountered severe financial problems in 1933, when he committed suicide.

Career with Studebaker 
During his long term as Studebaker's president, he encouraged the firm towards the production of small, sporty but economical cars on the European model, in particular the Erskine and Rockne series. He also published a history of the firm, in 1918.

Downfall and death 
His downfall lay in his failure to cut production and costs quickly in response to the slump of 1929 and 1930, which led to an insurmountable cashflow crisis. In 1930, he had declared a dividend of $7,800,000 which was five times the actual net profits of that year. In 1931, he paid a dividend of $3,500,000—also out of capital—a ruinous procedure which he unsuccessfully sought to correct through a merger with White Motor Company. Working capital had fallen from $26 million in 1926 to $3.5 million in 1932 and the banks were owed $6 million, for which they demanded payment. Studebaker defaulted and went into receivership.

Suffering from heart trouble and diabetes, ousted from his position at Studebaker, himself $350,000 in debt and his Studebaker stock now all but worthless, Erskine committed suicide on June 30, 1933, by shooting himself in the heart in his home on the south side of South Bend. He is interred at the Maple Hill Cemetery in Huntsville. Hendry added: "According to one account, the insurance companies duly and promptly paid all his debts and provided for his dependants".

University trustee 
In addition to his business work, Erskine served on the board of trustees of the University of Notre Dame, where his son Albert, Jr. studied.  The university awarded him an honorary LL.D. in 1924.  He took a strong interest in college football (a later Studebaker brand, the Rockne, was named after Notre Dame's football coach of the time), and initiated the Albert Russel Erskine Trophy for the national football championship.  The winner was chosen by a panel whose methods are, in essence, still used to select the champion team.  He was instrumental in a grant of $10,000 that the Studebaker Corporation made to Harvard University in 1926, to set up the Albert Russel Erskine Bureau for Street Traffic Research, which remained active through much of the 1930s.

References

External links 
 Brief biography of Erskine, with a photograph of him
 
 Page from Notre Dame archives detailing Erskine's involvement as a trustee of the university

1871 births
1933 deaths
Studebaker people
Suicides by firearm in Indiana
University of Notre Dame people
People from Huntsville, Alabama
20th-century American businesspeople
Businesspeople from Alabama
1933 suicides